In mathematics, Tsen's theorem states that a function field K of an algebraic curve over an algebraically closed field is quasi-algebraically closed (i.e., C1). This implies that the Brauer group of any such field vanishes, and more generally that all the Galois cohomology groups H i(K, K*) vanish for i ≥ 1. This result is used to calculate the étale cohomology groups of an algebraic curve.
 
The theorem was published by Chiungtze C. Tsen in 1933.

See also
 Tsen rank

References

 
 
 
 

Theorems in algebraic geometry